PIAS is a Belgian corporation that specialises in independent music recording, licencing, distribution, sales, and marketing. The company was founded in 1983 by Kenny Gates and Michel Lambot in Brussels, Belgium, and has over 250 employees, with 19 offices around the world. The group funds and partners with independent labels and artists.

In 2022, Universal Music Group acquires 49% [PIAS]

Divisions
 [PIAS] Recordings, which launched in 1999, is the group's in-house recorded music division, comprising eight labels, headquartered in [PIAS]'s UK office in Bermondsey, London.
 [PIAS] Cooperative. Long-lasting commercial partnerships with a handful of associated record labels (37 Adventures, Acid Jazz Records, ATO Records, Bella Union, DFA Records, Heavenly Recordings, Mute Records, Phantasy, Point Of Departure, Research, Transgressive Records & Wichita Recordings).
 [Integral] Distribution Services, the sales & distribution division providing custom marketing, sales, and distribution services to labels and artists on a national and international level. [PIAS] rebranded its distribution service to [Integral] in 2021.

Sublabels
Within [PIAS] Recordings
 Play It Again Sam
 Different Recordings, the electronic music imprint with Etienne de Crecy, Vitalic, Motorbass, Tiga, Crystal Castles and Crystal Fighters
 Le Label
 Urban
 Harmonia Mundi
 Inertia
 Jazz Village
 World Village

History
Michel Lambot and Kenny Gates met circa September 1981 at Michel’s record store then called "Casablanca Moon", exclusively selling records from independent labels and they quickly became friends.

In June 1982 the store "Casablanca Moon" was closed down and they made plans to start an import company named "Play It Again Sam". Play It Again Sam started importing from the UK in October 1982 and were based in the basement of Kenny's parents' house in Brussels, Belgium. Michel and Kenny were then respectively 21 and 19 years old. The company was incorporated in March 1983 with a starting capital of €5000 and the strategy rapidly became a "distributor" rather than an importer / wholesaler; that meant offering a full range of services to labels, such as promotion and marketing. The activities were then extended to production through the creation of their own label in 1984. In 1990, [PIAS] set up offices in Hilversum, Holland, then followed the takeover of Vital in 1993 (which was renamed [PIAS] UK in 2008). [PIAS] offices were set up in Paris and London in 1994, in Hamburg in 1995, in Madrid in 2000 and in New York in 2013 as well as two joint ventures called [PIAS] Nordic in Scandinavia and [PIAS] Australia.

In early 2013, [PIAS] acquired Cooperative Music (and the Coop-owned V2 Records label) from Universal Music Group, for a fee in the region of £500,000 forming the new business division [PIAS] Cooperative. The same year, [PIAS] acquired Rough Trade Distribution in the Benelux.

[PIAS] and Universal Music entered into a strategic global alliance on 9 June 2021. The agreement will see UMG finance [PIAS] in addition to accessing the company's international distribution network.

In November 2022, Universal Music Group purchased a 49 percent stake in PIAS. As part of the deal, the catalogues of several Universal artists were transferred to PIAS, including Jurassic 5, DJ Shadow, The Dandy Warhols, Texas, and Eels.

2011 warehouse fire
On 8 August 2011, during the 2011 riots in England a Sony DADC warehouse in the London Borough of Enfield which also acted as PIAS' primary distribution centre was destroyed by fire. Most of PIAS' inventory was considered lost including records from the over 100 British independent labels which PIAS distributes. Several album and single releases were affected by the fire, including the Arctic Monkeys single "The Hellcat Spangled Shalalala", the Battles single "My Machines" and the Charlie Simpson album Young Pilgrim. The total stock loss was reported to be between 3.5 million and 25 million units.

Distributed labels
PIAS distributes and services over 100 independent labels including the following:

Artist & Label Services

Brainfeeder
Beggars Group
4AD
Matador Records
True Panther Sounds
Rough Trade Records
XL Recordings
Young
All Saints Records
Thrill Jockey
Sub Pop
Soul Jazz Records
Secretly Group
Secretly Canadian
Jagjaguwar
Dead Oceans
Rock Action Records
Real World Records
Pure Noise Records
Ipecac Recordings
Hoo Ha Records
Ninja Tune
Big Dada
Mute Records
Memphis Industries
BMG Rights Management
Infectious Music
New West Records
Ignition Records
Hopeless Records
Invada Records
Fearless Records
Fat Possum Records
Fabric
Houndstooth
Feraltone
Drag City
Domino Recording Company
Chemikal Underground
Big Brother Recordings
Greco-Roman
Metroline Limited
Normaltown Records
Touch and Go Records
Quarterstick Records
Transmission Recordings
Victory Records
Bedroom Community
BB Records
Flock Music
Scripted Realities
Rivertones
Village Green Recordings
What's Your Rupture?
Arising Empire
Captured Tracks
The Vinyl Factory
Phantasy
Nuclear Blast
Self Raising Records
No Quarter Records
InFiné
Hi Records
Grönland Records
Warp
Cocoon Recordings
Bronze Rat Records
Asthmatic Kitty
Partisan Records
On-U Sound Records
Finders Keepers Records
Spinefarm Records
Tzadik Records

Cooperative

37 Adventures
Acid Jazz Records
Astral People Recordings
ATO Records
Bella Union
Blue Flowers Music
DFA Records
Heavenly Recordings
Mute Records
Phantasy
The Point of Departure Recording Co.
Prolifica Inc.
Research
Speedy Wunderground
Transgressive Records
V2 Records
Wichita Recordings

References

External links
 [PIAS] Website
 Play It Again, Sam
 Different Recordings

Mass media companies of Belgium
Labels distributed by Universal Music Group